WBAC (1340 AM) is a radio station licensed to Cleveland, Tennessee, United States.  The station is owned by East Tennessee Radio Group Iii, .

References

External links

BAC
Mass media in Bradley County, Tennessee
Talk radio stations in the United States